Rita McKeough (born 1951) is a Canadian interdisciplinary artist, musician and educator who frequently works in installation and performance.

Training and career
McKeough was born in 1951 in Antigonish, Nova Scotia. McKeough completed her BFA at the University of Calgary in 1975 and her MFA at the Nova Scotia College of Art and Design in 1979. She currently teaches at Alberta University of the Arts and resides in Calgary, Alberta.

Work
McKeough's practice uses a variety of analog, electronic and digital technology to create performance, media and sound works. Her pieces engage with feminist narratives, often using objects to perform sound. McKeough has stated the imperative for taking action and fostering a situation for activating agency through her practice: "In my work, it’s not about speaking for anybody, but wanting to create or imagine situations or a society where everyone has a voice and speaks from his or her own position." Much of her work is a call for action by creating a space for introspection, curiosity, humour and awareness. McKeough brings to attention various spectrum of social issues, including the oil industry and its impact on the ecosystem, meat production, human-animal relations, violence against women, and silenced female voices within private and public institutions.

Selected exhibitions

Veins, 2016

Veins is an interactive environmental installation presented at TRUCK Contemporary Art in Calgary, Alberta in 2016. Veins follows and builds on issues explored in her most recent works, Wilderment, Alternator, The Lion’s Share and H. This work is motivated by McKeough's sense of unease as it relates specifically to the ongoing planning and construction of the oil and gas pipelines being built across a fragile and vulnerable landscape. This work will look broadly at the sheer complications, multiplications and furtherance of the risks we take. The questioning of these processes will perhaps have an opening, and another layer of understanding of the vulnerability and complexities of the natural landscape.

Oh, Canada: Contemporary Art from North North America, 2015

Oh, Canada: Contemporary Art from North North America, organized by the Massachusetts Museum of Contemporary Art (MASS MoCA), is the largest survey of contemporary Canadian art ever produced outside Canada. Comprising more than 100 artworks by 62 artists and collectives from across the country, Oh, Canada is huge in both scale and scope. This unique collaboration encourages dialogue, debate, and a deeper understanding of local, regional, and national contemporary practice.

H, 2014

"H" was a performance that took place in an old barber shop in Sackville, New Brunswick, from July 24 to August 2, 2014. Residents of Sackville were requested to bring their "sick" (i.e., outdated) cell phones to the temporary emergency hospital set up in the barber shop, where, in tiny hospital beds, they were attended by a larger-than-life squirrel and a tree that used a variety of techniques to help the cell phones recover. The public could visit recovering cell phones or simply watch the process.

The Lion's Share, 2012

University of Lethbridge Art Gallery, 2012; Doris McCarthy Art Gallery, Scarborough, Ontario; Dalhousie Art Gallery, Halifax, 2013, Kenderdine Art Gallery at University of Saskatchewan, 2014 and Illingworth Kerr Gallery at Alberta College of Art and Design, Calgary, 2014.

Wilderment, 2010

Art Gallery of Alberta, Timeland: Alberta Biennial of Contemporary Art, 2010; Neutral Ground, Solo Exhibition, May, 2013

Alternator, 2008-2012

2008, Nuit Blanche, Toronto; 2009, ArtCity Festival, Calgary; 2009, Art in the Streets Festival, Lethbridge; 2012, Oh Canada! Massachusetts Museum of Contemporary Art, Boston.

In bocca al lupo—In the mouth of the wolf, 1991–92

Inspired by French feminist writers Hélène Cixous and Luce Irigaray and the punk icon Patti Smith, McKeough created a ninety-minute operatic performance/installation with a six piece choir, two solo vocalists, three musicians, six dancers, a prerecorded audio tape and slide and video projections. Audience and performers were engulfed by a large wooden figure. The work was created to foster a collective, tangible voice to women's anger.

Take it to the Teeth, 1993
This work, created with her collaborator Cheryl L'Hirondelle, was an installation and performance at the Glenbow Museum in 1993. Here McKeough and L'Hirondelle literally chewed through the museum walls to expose eight concealed audio tapes. The work poignantly created a dynamic between domestic abuse and empowered the female agency that recovers silenced voice.

Collections
McKeough's work is included in many public and private collections including the Canada Council Art Bank, Ottawa;  Glenbow Museum, Calgary; Walter Phillips Gallery at The Banff Centre; University of Lethbridge, Lethbridge; and the Dunlop Art Gallery, Regina.

Music/bands
McKeough is also a musician. She has played drums/percussion for a number of bands including Sleepy Panther, The Permuters, Sit Com, Mode d'Emploi, Almost Even, Demi Monde, Confidence Band, and Books All Over the Bed.

Awards
McKeough was the winner of a 2009 Governor General's Award in Visual and Media Arts and received the 2014 Canada Council for the Art International Residency at Artspace Sydney in Australia.

Bibliography

Sherlock, Diana (ed.) (2018). Rita McKeough: Works. Calgary: EMMEDIA Gallery & Production Society, M:ST Performative Art Festival, TRUCK Contemporary Art in Calgary.

Notes

External links
 

1951 births
Living people
Interdisciplinary artists
Artists from Nova Scotia
People from Antigonish, Nova Scotia
Canadian conceptual artists
Women conceptual artists
Governor General's Award in Visual and Media Arts winners
University of Calgary alumni
NSCAD University alumni
21st-century Canadian women artists